Autostrada A59, also called tangenziale di Como, is a motorway tangent to the city of Como in its southern area. The first part of about 3 km was opened to traffic on 23 May 2015. As of 2022, A59 stands as the shortest-length autostrada in Italy.

References

Buildings and structures completed in 2015
2015 establishments in Italy
A59
Transport in Lombardy
Ring roads in Italy